Bush cricket may refer to:

Tettigoniidae, an insect family known in British English as bush crickets
Eneopterinae, a subfamily known in American English as bush crickets

Animal common name disambiguation pages